The year-end charts for the Hot Latin Songs chart are published in the last issue of Billboard magazine every year. Initially, the chart was based on information provided by Nielsen Broadcast Data Systems, which collected airplay information from Latin radio stations in the United States. On the week ending October 20, 2012, the methodology was changed to track the best-performing Spanish-language songs based on digital downloads, streaming activity, and airplay from all radio stations in the country. The Year-End charts represent aggregated numbers from the weekly charts that were compiled for each artist, song and record company.

Mexican singer-songwriters Ana Gabriel and Juan Gabriel have had the best-selling single of the year three times each. The Latin Academy of Recording Arts & Sciences awarded Juan Gabriel the Person of Year Award for his professional accomplishments and commitment to philanthropic efforts. Venezuelan singer Franco De Vita's "Te Amo" ranked at number eight in 1989 and received a gold certification in Latin America and Spain for the album Al Norte del Sur. De Vita also wrote "Tal Vez", performed by Ricky Martin, the number-one single of 2003. Billboard magazine posthumously named singer Selena the Top Artist of the 1990s, due to her fourteen top-ten singles in the Hot Latin Songs chart (including seven number-one hits). Selena had the most successful singles of 1994 and 1995, "Amor Prohibido" and "No Me Queda Más".

Cuban singer-songwriter Jon Secada released the best-selling Latin album of 1992, titled Otro Día Más Sin Verte. The album earned a Grammy Award for Best Latin Pop Album, and yielded three singles, "Angel", "Sentir" and the title song, which were among the top Latin singles from 1992 and 1993. Alejandro Fernández released his album Me Estoy Enamorando in 1997; its first single "Si Tú Supieras" won the Lo Nuestro Award for Pop Song of the Year and ended 1998 as the second most successful single. During the 1990s, Mexican singer Luis Miguel became the first Latin singer to receive two platinum certifications in the United States with his albums Romance and Segundo Romance; he also had eight songs ranking as top singles of the year.

"A Puro Dolor", performed by Son by Four, became the best-performing Latin single from the 2000s in the United States. "Despacito" by Luis Fonsi and Daddy Yankee featuring Justin Bieber holds the record for the longest run at number one in the Hot Latin Songs chart. It held this position for 56 non-consecutive weeks, and finished as the Top Latin Single of 2017 and 2018. The Spanish versions of "Livin' la Vida Loca" by Ricky Martin, "Bailamos" by Enrique Iglesias and "Hips Don't Lie" by Shakira featuring Wyclef Jean were among the most successful Latin singles of 1999 and 2006. The English versions of these songs all peaked at number one in the Billboard Hot 100. With his song "No Me Doy Por Vencido", Puerto Rican singer Luis Fonsi became the first artist to appear in the top ten for two consecutive years for the best-performing Latin singles with the same track.

Top Songs of the Year

  – represents the best-performing single of the year.

Sources: 1987, 1988–1998, 1999, 2000, 2001, 2002, 2003, 2004, 2005, 2006, 2007, 2008, 2009, 2010, 2011. 2012. 2013. 2014, 
2015, 
2016, 2017, 
2018 
2019
2019
2021
2022

References

Billboard charts
Latin music songs